Pocola may refer to:

Pocola, Bihor, a commune in Bihor County, Romania
Pocola, Oklahoma, a town in Oklahoma, United States